Cheatham County is a county located in the U.S. state of Tennessee. As of the 2020 census, the population was 41,072. Its county seat is Ashland City. Cheatham County is part of the Nashville-Davidson–Murfreesboro–Franklin, TN Metropolitan Statistical Area. It is located in Middle Tennessee.

History
Cheatham County was created by an Act of the Tennessee General Assembly in 1856, from lands formerly of Davidson, Dickson, Montgomery, and Robertson counties. Cheatham County was named for Edward Saunders Cheatham, a state legislator.

Geography

The county is bisected from northwest to southeast by the Cumberland River, with Ashland City located on its northern bank.  The southern portion of the county is bisected from southeast to northwest by the Harpeth River, which meanders through generally hilly country, and along whose course are located the communities of Kingston Springs, largely to the north of Interstate 40 (I-40), and Pegram, along U.S. Route 70 (US 70).  The western border of the central portion of the county is defined by the course of the Harpeth.  The hills east of the Harpeth and south of the Cumberland are partly set aside by the state as the Cheatham State Wildlife Management Area.  North of Ashland City the hills subside into more level highlands, where the community of Pleasant View is located just south of I-24, which generally delineates the northern border of the county.

Adjacent counties
Robertson County (northeast)
Davidson County (east)
Williamson County (south)
Dickson County (west)
Montgomery County (northwest)

State protected areas
Cheatham Wildlife Management Area
Cheatham Lake Wildlife Management Area (part)
Harpeth River State Park

Demographics

2020 census

As of the 2020 United States census, there were 41,072 people, 15,089 households, and 11,022 families residing in the county.

2000 census
At the 2000 census there were 35,912 people, 12,878 households, and 10,160 families in the county.  The population density was 119 people per square mile (46/km2).  There were 13,508 housing units at an average density of 45 per square mile (17/km2).  The racial makeup of the county was 96.86% White, 1.48% Black or African American, 0.38% Native American, 0.18% Asian, 0.05% Pacific Islander, 0.36% from other races, and 0.70% from two or more races.  1.22%. were Hispanic or Latino of any race.

In 2005 The racial makeup of the county was 94.8% non-Hispanic whites, 2.1% African-Americans and 1.7% Latinos.
In 2000 Of the 12,878 households 39.60% had children under the age of 18 living with them, 64.90% were married couples living together, 9.60% had a female householder with no husband present, and 21.10% were non-families. 16.90% of households were one person and 5.30% were one person aged 65 or older.  The average household size was 2.76 and the average family size was 3.08.

The age distribution was 27.70% under the age of 18, 7.30% from 18 to 24, 33.50% from 25 to 44, 23.00% from 45 to 64, and 8.60% 65 or older.  The median age was 35 years. For every 100 females, there were 100.30 males.  For every 100 females age 18 and over, there were 97.40 males.

The median household income was $45,836 and the median family income  was $49,143. Males had a median income of $34,476 versus $25,191 for females. The per capita income for the county was $18,882.  About 5.30% of families and 7.40% of the population were below the poverty line, including 7.60% of those under age 18 and 9.40% of those age 65 or over.

Communities

City
Pleasant View

Towns
Ashland City (county seat)
Kingston Springs
Pegram

Unincorporated communities
Bell Town
Chapmansboro
 Cheap Hill
Craggie Hope
Joelton (partial)
Shacklett

Politics
Cheatham County is a Republican stronghold: the last Democrat to carry this county on a presidential level was Bill Clinton in 1996. The county is politically a typical “Solid South” rural county whose support for secession made it rock-ribbed Democratic until the middle 1960s when hostility towards civil rights for blacks drove it to George Wallace in 1968 and Richard Nixon in 1972, before turning to more centrist Democrats until the 1990s.

Notable people 
Upchurch (musician)

Hickok45

See also
National Register of Historic Places listings in Cheatham County, Tennessee

References

External links

 Official site
 Cheatham County Chamber of Commerce
 Cheatham County, TNGenWeb - free genealogy resources for the county

 
1856 establishments in Tennessee
Populated places established in 1856
Nashville metropolitan area
Middle Tennessee
Cheatham family